COWCAT Games is an independent French video game company headquartered in the Andrézieux-Bouthéon commune of the Loire department in central France of the Auvergne-Rhône-Alpes region, found and owned by Fabrice Breton. The company self-publishes and develops video games. They also ported games by other developers. Shortly after the release of BROK the InvestiGator on PC, the developer demonstrated a scam operation performed by Steam Curators, racketing keys from devs to resell for profits.

History

Games developed

Games published

References

External Links 
 

2015 establishments in France
French companies established in 2015
Companies based in Auvergne-Rhône-Alpes
Video game development companies
Video game companies of France
Video game publishers
Video game companies established in 2015